Outlaw Brothers is a 1990 Hong Kong film directed by Frankie Chan. It has been described as Frankie Chan's best film as a director.

Cast
 Frankie Chan - James
 Siu Chung Mok - Bond
 Michael Miu Kiu Wai - Sergeant Tai Hwa Wang
 Yukari Oshima - Tequila
 Michiko Nishiwaki - Miego
 Sheila Chin - Lan
 Jeffrey Falcon
 Mark Houghton
 Vincent Lyn
 Ken Boyle
 Jonathan Gisger
 Dan Mintz
 Ken Goodman
 Steve Tartalia
 Anthony Houk
 Bruce Fontaine

References

External links
 
 Outlaw Brothers on HKCinemagic
 Outlaw Brothers at the Hong Kong Movie Database

Films directed by Frankie Chan
1990s Hong Kong films